Winona Springs is an extinct town in southwest Carroll County, in the U.S. state of Arkansas.

The community was located in Winona Hollow adjacent to the Winona Spring. A meander in the Kings River is about one half mile to the southeast. Berryville lies about six miles to the northeast.

History
The town's chief industry was timber, and in the 1880s, it contained a sawmill.

References

Geography of Carroll County, Arkansas
Ghost towns in Arkansas